Alice is a 2002 French-British film directed by Sylvie Ballyot and produced by Nathlie Eybrard and Jean Philippe Labadie about Alice and her sister Manon who is about to be married.

Synopsis
Alice has deeply buried feelings and memories for her sister Manon, who is about to be married.  During their childhood, the two sisters were extremely close not only emotionally, but also sexually.  With news of the wedding, the pain of the past resurfaces and Alice's relationship with her girlfriend Elsa starts to fall apart.  As the wedding approaches, Alice reminisces about her childhood, and has trouble letting go of her incestuous relationship with Manon.

Cast
 Anne Bargain as Alice
 Valentine Dubreuil as Young Alice
 Élodie Mennegand as Manon
 Lucie Lessieur as Young Manon
 Lei Dinety as Elsa
 David Kammenos as Atom
 Alain Lahaye as the Father
 Armelle Legrand as the Mother
 Violetta Ferrer as the Grandmother

External links
 

2002 films
Lesbian-related films
Incest in film
2000s French-language films
British drama films
2002 LGBT-related films
French LGBT-related films
French drama films
British LGBT-related films
LGBT-related drama films
2000s British films
2000s French films